Hughes Brook flows into the Little Delaware River east of Delhi, New York.

Rivers of New York (state)
Rivers of Delaware County, New York
Tributaries of the West Branch Delaware River